Großderschau is a municipality in the Havelland district, in Brandenburg, Germany. The Dosse river runs past the town.

Demography

References

External links
 Großderschau, multi-language information

Localities in Havelland